Saramură is a Romanian "sauce" for marinating. It can be found in nature: water containing salt; salt water spring or it can be homemade by boiling water with salt and other ingredients (depending on individual taste, such as garlic, pepper, chili, etc.). The sauce is used in the home (to preserve some foods as meat, fish, etc.), in agriculture, in the tanning industry. After being marinated and dried the alimentary goods can be smoked or cooked or they can be eaten as they are. Recipes vary greatly, the common part being meat /fish grilled (sometimes on a salt bed). Usually the dish includes vegetables, mamaliga, polenta, potatoes, etc.  (The Romanian word itself  means "brine".)

Lipovans would call  the dish rassol, e.g.,  saramură de carp (carp saramura) is called karp rassol. Saramură de carp is often translated as "carp in brine" or "salted carp".

See also
 List of smoked foods

References

Further reading
Saramură de peşte ("Fish saramura", a recipe), The Epoch Times, 16.11.2011 

Romanian cuisine
Salted foods
Fish dishes
Meat dishes
Smoked fish